Draguignan is a commune in the Var department in the administrative region of Provence-Alpes-Côte d'Azur (formerly Provence), southeastern France.

It is a sub-prefecture of the department and self-proclaimed "capital of Artillery" and "Porte du Verdon".

Name and motto 

According to legend, the name of the city is derived from the Latin name "Draco/Draconem" (dragon): a bishop, called Saint Hermentaire, killed a dragon and saved people.

The Latin motto of Draguignan is Alios nutrio, meos devoro (I nourish others, I devour my own).

Geography 

The elevation is 200 m. The highest hill near Draguignan is Malmont (551 m). The main river near Draguignan is the Nartuby.

Climate 

Draguignan's climate is the same as the normal conditions of the Mediterranean climate. The nights of frost are rare and the negative temperatures occur only a few days a year. Thus the winters are mild and wet, and the summers warm and dry, the town is protected from the winds by the Malmont and the western massif of the Selves. During the summer the precipitation is extremely low whereas autumn is subjected to frequent rains.

Geology 

The hills downstream of Draguignan date from the Middle Triassic, while those that rise upstream belong to the Upper Triassic.

Up North, we can see a long bar of stony plateau, with summits made of Jurassic limestones, sometimes intersected by deep canyons. This northern region of the "baous" or also called massive mountainous barriers, deeply wrinkled and fractured, reveals successive basins in the east–west direction.

Draguignan is in a zone of moderate risk of seismicity.

Communication routes

Roads 

There is no highway going through the city of Draguignan but the town is directly connected by the D 1555 to a major highway, the A8.

A bypass route makes it possible to avoid the city center from the south when arriving from Trans-en-Provence and to get to the hospital in the north of the city more quickly.

The city is located 869 km away from Paris, 141 km from Marseille, 89 km from Nice, 86 km from Toulon, 30 km from Fréjus, 105 km from Digne-les-Bains and about 35 km from the Gulf of Saint-Tropez.

Rail transport 
Since 1981, the closest railway station is Les Arcs–Draguignan, which is served by the TGV and is located twelve kilometers from the city center. Bus shuttles have been set by the agglomeration community of Draguignan from the former railway station of Draguignan, which was converted into a bus station. Draguignan train station features two turnstiles: one for SNCF and another for the transport of the agglomeration.

Public transport services 
Urban transports are managed by the TED community, which offers three urban lines as well as lines to other municipalities such as Les Arcs-Draguignan, Ampus, Flayosc, Le Muy and Lorgues. The buses of the General Council of the Var serve from Draguignan the cities of Toulon, Brignoles, Aups, Fayence, Fréjus and Le Luc.

A project by BHNS is being studied, to connect Draguignan city center to Les Arcs-Draguignan station in 17 minutes instead of 25 minutes currently.

History 

The name of Draguignan ("Draconianum") appeared for the first time in 909. During the Middle-Ages, Draguignan was a small village whose people lived from olive and grape cultivation. Draguignan became the "prefecture" of the Var in 1790, at the beginning of the French Revolution. This was despite the town by far not being the biggest city in the department. It remained the seat of the prefecture until 1974. In the 19th century and during a large part of the 20th century, the people of Draguignan (in French: "Dracénois", in English: "Draceners") voted for liberal parties (Radical-Socialist Party, Socialist Party).

The town was occupied by the Wehrmacht in 1942-44 and freed in August 1944, after Operation Dragoon. The city welcomed the "Ecole nationale d'artillerie" (Artillery School) in 1976, then the "Ecole nationale d'infanterie" (Infantry School) in 2010. The arrival of the military involved the development of the city : the small town became a city in the second part of the 20th century : 13,400 citizens in 1954, 33,000 in 2000, 38,000 in 2010. On June 15, 2010, the city was flooded. Torrential rain caused the deaths of 12 people in the town and 25 in the neighborhoods.

Population

Major attractions 

 Museum of Artillery (Napoleonic wars, World War I, World War II, Indochina, etc.)
 Museum of "Arts et traditions populaires"
Rhone American Cemetery and Memorial (American World War II cemetery) (see operation Dragoon)
 The Eglise St Michel
 Eglise Notre-Dame du Peuple
 The Dolmen Pierre de la fée (fairy's Stone), also known as the fruit rock.

Personalities connected to Draguignan
 

 Nicolas Agnesi, born in Draguignan
 Karl "Psycho" Amoussou, MMA fighter in Bellator Fighting Championships, born in Draguignan.
 Jean-Marie Auberson, died in Draguignan
 Sébastien Bouin, rock climber, born in Draguignan 
 Patricia Burke, a British actress, died in Draguignan
 Georges Clemenceau, was a politician of Draguignan: deputy of the district of Draguignan (1885–1893) and senator of the same district (1902–1920), French prime minister in 1906-1909 and 1917–1920
 Alain Connes, born in Draguignan
 Michel Constantin, died in Draguignan
 Abel Douay, born in Draguignan
 Michaël Fabre, born in Draguignan
 Gustave Ferrié, studied in Draguignan
 Estève Garcin, born in Draguignan
 Claude Gay, born in Draguignan
 Maximin Isnard, was a politician of Draguignan
 Michel Lafourcade, died in Draguignan
 Hippolyte Mège-Mouriès, born in Draguignan
 Charlotte Morel, born in Draguignan
 Louis Moréri, studied in Draguignan
 Henri Mulet, French organist and composer, spent the last 30 years of his life in Draguignan, as organist of the cathedral there.
 Émile Ollivier, was a politician of Draguignan: deputy of the district of Draguignan, then prime minister in 1870
 Lily Pons, born in Draguignan
 Ronald Searle, a British artist, died in Draguignan
 Philippe Seguin, studied in Draguignan
 Georges Thill, died in Draguignan
 Christopher Tolkien, lived in Draguignan from 1975 until his death in January 2020

Twin towns 

  Tuttlingen, Germany

Pictures

See also 

 Communes of the Var department
  (in French)
  (in French)
List of works by Auguste Carli

References

External links 

City council website (in French)

Communes of Var (department)
French Riviera
Subprefectures in France